Belichick is a surname. Notable people with the name include:

 Bill Belichick (born 1952), American football coach
 Brian Belichick, American football coach, son of Bill
 Stephen Belichick (born 1987), American football coach, son of Bill
 Steve Belichick (1919–2005), American football player and coach, father of Bill